Koyra Chiini (figuratively "town language"), or Western Songhay, is a member of the Songhay languages spoken in Mali by about 200,000 people (in 1999) along the Niger River in Timbuktu and upriver from it in the towns of Diré, Tonka, Goundam and Niafunké as well as in the Saharan town of Araouane to its north. In this area, Koyra Chiini is the dominant language and the lingua franca, although minorities speaking Hassaniya Arabic, Tamasheq and Fulfulde are found. Djenné Chiini , the dialect spoken in Djenné, is mutually comprehensible, but has noticeable differences, in particular two extra vowels ( and ) and syntactic differences related to focalisation.

East of Timbuktu, Koyra Chiini gives way relatively abruptly to another Songhay language, Koyraboro Senni.

Unlike most Songhai languages, Koyra Chiini has no phonemic tones and has subject–verb–object word order rather than subject–object–verb. It has changed the original Songhay z to j.

Phonology 

All vowels have lengthened counterparts.

References

 ed. Jeffrey Heath, Wilhelm J. Möhlig, 1998. Texts in Koyra Chiini Songhay of Timbuktu, Mali.  Ruediger Koeppe.  .
 Jeffrey Heath, Dictionnaire Songhay-Anglais-Français: Tome 1 - Koyra Chiini, ou "songhay de Tombouctou", Tome 2 - Djenné Chiini, ou "songhay de Djenné".  L'Harmattan:Paris 1998.  .

Songhay languages
Languages of Mali
Non-tonal languages in tonal families
Subject–verb–object languages